Andover is a borough in Sussex County, in the U.S. state of New Jersey. As of the 2020 United States census, the borough's population was 595, a decrease of 11 (−1.8%) from the 2010 census count of 606, which in turn reflected a decline of 52 (−7.9%) from the 658 counted in the 2000 Census.

Andover was incorporated as a borough by an act of the New Jersey Legislature on March 25, 1904, from portions of Andover Township. The borough was named for Andover Township, which was in turn named for Andover, Hampshire, England.

Geography
According to the United States Census Bureau, the borough had a total area of 1.36 square miles (3.53 km2), including 1.35 square miles (3.49 km2) of land and 0.02 square miles (0.04 km2) of water (1.18%).

The borough borders the Sussex County municipalities of Andover Township, Byram Township and Green Township.

Demographics

2010 census

The Census Bureau's 2006–2010 American Community Survey showed that (in 2010 inflation-adjusted dollars) median household income was $67,000 (with a margin of error of +/− $20,882) and the median family income was $78,889 (+/− $19,386). Males had a median income of $54,583 (+/− $21,861) versus $41,667 (+/− $24,816) for females. The per capita income for the borough was $34,262 (+/− $7,656). About 6.7% of families and 12.7% of the population were below the poverty line, including 21.3% of those under age 18 and none of those age 65 or over.

2000 census
As of the 2000 United States census there were 658 people, 261 households, and 180 families residing in the borough. The population density was 451.9 people per square mile (174.0/km2). There were 273 housing units at an average density of 187.5 per square mile (72.2/km2). The racial makeup of the borough was 92.71% White, 2.28% African American, 0.76% Native American, 2.28% Asian, 0.15% Pacific Islander, 1.22% from other races, and 0.61% from two or more races. Hispanic or Latino of any race were 2.58% of the population.

There were 261 households, out of which 29.1% had children under the age of 18 living with them, 50.6% were married couples living together, 14.2% had a female householder with no husband present, and 30.7% were non-families. 24.9% of all households were made up of individuals, and 6.5% had someone living alone who was 65 years of age or older. The average household size was 2.52 and the average family size was 2.98.

In the borough the population was spread out, with 21.7% under the age of 18, 7.6% from 18 to 24, 35.3% from 25 to 44, 25.5% from 45 to 64, and 9.9% who were 65 years of age or older. The median age was 38 years. For every 100 females, there were 103.7 males. For every 100 females age 18 and over, there were 98.8 males.

The median income for a household in the borough was $60,000, and the median income for a family was $69,688. Males had a median income of $38,056 versus $30,950 for females. The per capita income for the borough was $25,914. None of the families and 2.8% of the population were living below the poverty line, including no under eighteens and 9.1% of those over 64.

Government

Local government
Andover is governed under the Borough form of New Jersey municipal government, which is used in 218 municipalities (of the 564) statewide, making it the most common form of government in New Jersey. The governing body is comprised of the Mayor and the Borough Council, with all positions elected at-large on a partisan basis as part of the November general election. The Mayor is elected directly by the voters to a four-year term of office. The Borough Council is comprised of six members elected to serve three-year terms on a staggered basis, with two seats coming up for election each year in a three-year cycle. The Borough form of government used by Andover is a "weak mayor / strong council" government in which council members act as the legislative body with the mayor presiding at meetings and voting only in the event of a tie. The mayor can veto ordinances subject to an override by a two-thirds majority vote of the council. The mayor makes committee and liaison assignments for council members, and most appointments are made by the mayor with the advice and consent of the council.

, the Mayor of Andover Borough is Republican John A. Morgan, whose term of office ends December 31, 2023. Members of the Borough Council are Lynn T. Delfing (R, 2023), Melvin Dennison (R, 2024), John P. Hoag (R, 2023), Randolph Mallon (D, 2022; appointed to serve an unexpired term), Robert L. Smith (R, 2024) and Kim Walter (R, 2022).

In February 2022, the Borough Council selected Randolph Mallon to fill the seat expiring in December 2022 that had been held by Peter Pearson until he resigned from office the previous month.

In February 2016, the Borough Council chose John Hoag from three candidates proposed by the Republican municipal committee to fill the seat that had been held Eskil S. Danielson that will expire in December 2017; Hoag will serve on an interim basis until the November 2016 general election, when voters will choose someone to serve the balance of the term.

In February 2015, the Borough Council selected Michael Figueiredo from a list of three candidates nominated by the Democratic municipal committee to fill the seat expiring in December 2016 that became vacant when Deborah McGowan resigned from office. Figueiredo served on an interim basis until the November 2015 general election, when he was elected to serve the one year remaining on the term of office.

Law enforcement is covered by the New Jersey State Police. Fire protection is covered by the Andover Borough Volunteer Fire Department. EMS is handled by the Lakeland Emergency Squad.

Federal, state, and county representation
Andover Borough is located in the 7th Congressional district and is part of New Jersey's 24th state legislative district.

 

Sussex County is governed by a Board of County Commissioners whose five members are elected at-large in partisan elections on a staggered basis, with either one or two seats coming up for election each year. At an annual reorganization meeting held in the beginning of January, the board selects a Commissioner Director and Deputy Director from among its members, with day-to-day supervision of the operation of the county delegated to a County Administrator. , Sussex County's Commissioners are 
Commissioner Director Anthony Fasano (R, Hopatcong, term as commissioner and as commissioner director ends December 31, 2022), 
Deputy Director Chris Carney (R, Frankford Township, term as commissioner ends 2024; term as deputy director ends 2022), 
Dawn Fantasia (R, Franklin, 2024), 
Jill Space (R, Wantage Township, 2022; appointed to serve an unexpired term) and 
Herbert Yardley (R, Stillwater Township, 2023). In May 2022, Jill Space was appointed to fill the seat expiring in December 2022 that had been held by Sylvia Petillo until she resigned from office.

Constitutional officers elected on a countywide basis are 
County Clerk Jeffrey M. Parrott (R, Wantage Township, 2026),
Sheriff Michael F. Strada (R, Hampton Township, 2022) and 
Surrogate Gary R. Chiusano (R, Frankford Township, 2023). The County Administrator is Gregory V. Poff II, whose appointment expires in 2025.

Politics
As of March 2011, there were a total of 403 registered voters in Andover, of which 109 (27.0% vs. 16.5% countywide) were registered as Democrats, 152 (37.7% vs. 39.3%) were registered as Republicans and 142 (35.2% vs. 44.1%) were registered as Unaffiliated. There were no voters registered to other parties. Among the borough's 2010 Census population, 66.5% (vs. 65.8% in Sussex County) were registered to vote, including 84.3% of those ages 18 and over (vs. 86.5% countywide).

In the 2012 presidential election, Republican Mitt Romney received 143 votes (50.9% vs. 59.4% countywide), ahead of Democrat Barack Obama with 129 votes (45.9% vs. 38.2%) and other candidates with 8 votes (2.8% vs. 2.1%), among the 281 ballots cast by the borough's 400 registered voters, for a turnout of 70.3% (vs. 68.3% in Sussex County). In the 2008 presidential election, Republican John McCain received 139 votes (49.5% vs. 59.2% countywide) tied with Democrat Barack Obama with 139 votes (49.5% vs. 38.7%) and other candidates with 2 votes (0.7% vs. 1.5%), among the 281 ballots cast by the borough's 404 registered voters, for a turnout of 69.6% (vs. 76.9% in Sussex County). In the 2004 presidential election, Republican George W. Bush received 171 votes (55.5% vs. 63.9% countywide), ahead of Democrat John Kerry with 134 votes (43.5% vs. 34.4%) and other candidates with one vote (0.3% vs. 1.3%), among the 308 ballots cast by the borough's 421 registered voters, for a turnout of 73.2% (vs. 77.7% in the whole county).

In the 2013 gubernatorial election, Republican Chris Christie received 61.6% of the vote (106 cast), ahead of Democrat Barbara Buono with 32.6% (56 votes), and other candidates with 5.8% (10 votes), among the 173 ballots cast by the borough's 396 registered voters (1 ballot was spoiled), for a turnout of 43.7%. In the 2009 gubernatorial election, Republican Chris Christie received 117 votes (58.8% vs. 63.3% countywide), ahead of Democrat Jon Corzine with 61 votes (30.7% vs. 25.7%), Independent Chris Daggett with 18 votes (9.0% vs. 9.1%) and other candidates with 2 votes (1.0% vs. 1.3%), among the 199 ballots cast by the borough's 386 registered voters, yielding a 51.6% turnout (vs. 52.3% in the county).

Education
Public school students in pre-kindergarten through eighth grade attend the Andover Regional School District, together with students from Andover Township. As of the 2018–19 school year, the district, comprised of two schools, had an enrollment of 450 students and 48.4 classroom teachers (on an FTE basis), for a student–teacher ratio of 9.3:1. Schools in the district (with 2018–19 enrollment data from the National Center for Education Statistics) are 
Florence M. Burd Elementary School with 225 students in grades Pre-K–4 and 
Long Pond Middle School with 220 students in grades 5–8. The district's board of education has nine members who set policy and oversee the fiscal and educational operation of the district through its administration, with Andover Borough assigned one of the nine seats, based on the population of the two constituent municipalities.

Public school students in ninth through twelfth grades attend Newton High School in Newton, together with students from Andover Township and Green Township, as part of a sending/receiving relationship with the Newton Public School District. As of the 2018–19 school year, the high school had an enrollment of 715 students and 66.0 classroom teachers (on an FTE basis), for a student–teacher ratio of 10.8:1.

Since 1972, Lakeland Andover School has been operating as a therapeutic, nonprofit, private day school for students in grades 7–12, serving the educational and vocational training needs of students with emotional and behavioral challenges.

Transportation

Roads and highways

U.S. Route 206 and County Route 517 pass through the borough.

Public transportation
Lakeland Bus Lines provides service operating along Interstate 80 between Newton, New Jersey and the Port Authority Bus Terminal in Midtown Manhattan.

As part of restoring train service via the Lackawanna Cut-Off, $61 million had been secured by former U.S. Congressman Rodney Frelinghuysen to rebuild a  stretch of the former railroad to a new station in Andover, which had been projected by 2021 but currently is estimated to open sometime after 2027.

Points of interest
Several places in Andover are listed on the New Jersey Register of Historic Places. The Grist Mill Stone House, built 1760, is part of the Andover Iron Forge and Furnace and Workers' Housing area in the Andover Borough Historic District. The ornate house on Brighton Avenue is listed individually. The Hole in the Wall Stone Arch Bridge, built by the Sussex Railroad, crosses the Morris and Sussex Turnpike and now carries the Sussex Branch Trail, a rail trail.

The Iron Master's Mansion on Main Street was part of the Iron Works at Andover.

Notable people

People who were born in, residents of, or otherwise closely associated with Andover include:

 Stephen M. Balzer (–1940), mechanic and developer of an early car and airplane engine
 Kenneth Burke (1897–1993), cultural and literary critic and philosopher; Harry and Tom Chapin's grandfather
 Finn M. W. Caspersen (1941–2009), financier and philanthropist
 Newman E. Drake (1860–1930), founder of the Drake's baking company
 Rob Freeman (born 1981), member of Hidden in Plain View

References

External links

 Andover Borough website
 Andover Regional School District
 Data for Andover Regional School District, National Center for Education Statistics
 Newton High School
 The Township Journal, community newspaper
 Abandoned Mines of Andover, New Jersey

 
1904 establishments in New Jersey
Borough form of New Jersey government
Boroughs in Sussex County, New Jersey
Populated places established in 1904